Bartłomiej "Bartosz" Kizierowski (born 20 February 1977) is a freestyle who represented Poland in four consecutive Summer Olympics, starting in 1996.

Biography
Kizierowski began his career as a backstroke swimmer, but changed to freestyle in the mid-1990s.

Kizierowski trained at The Race Club, a swimming techniques training club founded by Olympic Swimmers Gary Hall, Jr. and his father, Gary Hall, Sr. The Race Club, originally known as "The World Team," was designed to serve as a training group for elite swimmers across the world in preparation for the 2000 Sydney Olympic Games. To be able to train with the Race Club, one must either have been ranked in the top 20 in the world the past 3 calendar years or top 3 in their nation in the past year. The Race Club included such well known swimmers as Roland Mark Schoeman, Mark Foster, Ryk Neethling, and Therese Alshammar.

He won his first medal in 2002 at the European Championships in Berlin, in the 50 m freestyle (gold medal). He won a gold at the 2006 European Championships in Budapest.

He lives and studies in the United States, at the University of California, Berkeley.

He is a 1996 Graduate of Mission Viejo High School, where he swam for Coach Mike Pelton.

See also
 The Race Club

References

 

1977 births
Living people
Polish male backstroke swimmers
Polish male freestyle swimmers
Olympic swimmers of Poland
Swimmers at the 1996 Summer Olympics
Swimmers at the 2000 Summer Olympics
Swimmers at the 2004 Summer Olympics
Swimmers at the 2008 Summer Olympics
California Golden Bears men's swimmers
Swimmers from Warsaw
World Aquatics Championships medalists in swimming
Medalists at the FINA World Swimming Championships (25 m)
European Aquatics Championships medalists in swimming
Universiade medalists in swimming
Goodwill Games medalists in swimming
Universiade gold medalists for Poland
Universiade silver medalists for Poland
Medalists at the 2001 Summer Universiade
Competitors at the 2001 Goodwill Games